Anthony Taylor (born 6 September 1946 in Glasgow) is a former professional footballer, who made 345 appearances in the Scottish League and Football League playing mainly as a left back.

Playing career
Taylor began his career at Kilmarnock in 1962, before moving to Celtic from 1964 to 1967. However he did not make a first team appearance for either club.

In 1967, he signed for Morton making 22 appearances before signing for Crystal Palace on 31 October 1968. Taylor played in 195 league games for Crystal Palace between then and 1974, scoring eight goals. It was during this period that he was converted from a winger to left back. His debut came on 9 November 1968 in a 2–0 away win against Oxford United and Taylor was ever present for the remainder of that season (25 appearances) which saw Palace reach the top tier for the first time. In Crystal Palace's subsequent four seasons in the top flight, Taylor made 30, 36, 41 and 40 appearances respectively.

Crystal Palace were relegated in 1973 but Taylor was Player of the Year and remained thereafter making 20 appearances in the 1973–74 season before being transferred to Southend United in August 1974, where he made 56 appearances over two seasons. He then saw out his career with spells at, Swindon Town, Bristol Rovers, Portsmouth, Kilmarnock, Albion Rovers and Northampton Town.

Coaching career
Taylor agreed to take over as player/manager of Athlone Town A.F.C. in August 1977 but despite playing some pre season friendlies resigned before the 1977–78 League of Ireland season commenced.

In 1980, he moved to Canada and played for Panhellenic, a Greek team in the National Soccer League, a semi-pro Toronto league. The high point with this team was playing in a tournament against Benfica, Toronto Italia and Partizan Belgrade.

After working as an assistant coach with Celtic, Taylor became coach of Canada's national boy's youth team in the 1980s. He also served as the (senior) national team manager during an unsuccessful bid to qualify for the 1990 FIFA World Cup finals.

Taylor is a Technical Staff Member of the Burlington Youth Soccer Club in Burlington, Ontario.

References

External links 
 
 Sporting-heroes.net Taylor's photograph and statistics with Crystal Palace

1946 births
Living people
Albion Rovers F.C. players
Bristol Rovers F.C. players
Canada men's national soccer team managers
Celtic F.C. players
Crystal Palace F.C. players
Expatriate soccer managers in Canada
Expatriate soccer players in Canada
Association football defenders
Greenock Morton F.C. players
Hamilton Academical F.C. players
Kilmarnock F.C. players
Footballers from Glasgow
Northampton Town F.C. players
Portsmouth F.C. players
Scottish expatriate footballers
Scottish expatriate football managers
Scottish expatriate sportspeople in Canada
Scottish Football League players
Scottish football managers
Scottish footballers
Southend United F.C. players
Swindon Town F.C. players
English Football League players
Canadian National Soccer League players
Livingston F.C. non-playing staff